Assault Suit, also known as Assault Suits, is a series of futuristic robotic war video games developed by NCS featuring soldiers manning the eponymous gigantic humanoid mecha.  Spanning the course of 15 years and beyond, the games would be cross-distributed, cross-published and developed between the U.S. and Japan. It would be known as one of the most challenging series to follow due to the drastic changes from game to game.

Releases

The series

Assault Suit Leynos (Target Earth)
Assault Suit Leynos, released in North America as Target Earth, is the first game in the series. It was released for the Sega Genesis.

One scene, where a comrade who doesn't make it back to the ship burns up in the atmosphere, was removed from the North American version.

Assault Suits Valken (Cybernator)
The success of the first Assault Suits game in Japan would spawn another game on the Super Famicom. The artwork style, assault armor concepts, as well as the dialogue engine would remain similar to that of Target Earth/Assault Suits Leynos, but with major graphical improvements. The US name Cybernator added confusion to American gamers and disconnected many of the fans from the Target Earth roots. This game was actually a prequel to Assault Suit Leynos, taking place nearly a decade before.

Cybernator was the subject of censorship during its localization. The Japanese version featured written dialog accompanied by a portrait of the speaker, but for some reason, these portraits were removed during localization. There was also a scene absent in which the president of the enemy forces, after realizing that his nation has been defeated, commits suicide. It is unknown whether Konami or Nintendo took action on these censorships.

An enhanced remake was released for the PS2 in 2004.

Assault Suit Leynos 2
Assault Suit Leynos 2 arrived on the Sega Saturn as the true sequel to Assault Suit Leynos, but was released only in Japan.

Assault Suits Valken 2
The sequel to the SNES title in the series was released on the PlayStation. It differed from the rest of the series, as it was a Strategy/RPG, unlike the rest, all being Action/Shooter/Platform titles. After the release in 1999, the same game would be reprinted by the company Four Winds on August 30, 2001. This game was never released outside Japan either.

Assault Suit Leynos
A remake of Assault Suit Leynos was released for the PlayStation 4 & Microsoft Windows by Gunhound EX developer Dracue Software. Originally set to launch in late 2014 or early 2015, the game was delayed to December 2015 to allow the team to implement a cooperative mode as well as multiple endings. It finally released on July 12, 2016.

Famitsu gave it a 26 out of 40 score.

See also
 Armored Core
 Front Mission
 Heavy Gear
 Metal Warriors

References

External links
NCS  NCS Website
Starship Modeler

 
Video games about mecha
Video game franchises introduced in 1990